Lap Corner is an unincorporated community in northern Sugar Ridge Township, Clay County, Indiana, just north of Center Point. It is part of the Terre Haute Metropolitan Statistical Area.

Geography

References

Unincorporated communities in Clay County, Indiana
Unincorporated communities in Indiana
Terre Haute metropolitan area